Rhagoletis turanica is a species of tephritid or fruit fly in the genus Rhagoletis of the family Tephritidae.

References

turanica
Insects described in 1961